Portugal competed at the 1984 Summer Paralympics in Stoke Mandeville, Great Britain and New York City, United States. 17 competitors from Portugal won 14 medals including 4 gold, 3 silver and 7 bronze and finished 26th in the medal table.

See also 
 Portugal at the Paralympics
 Portugal at the 1984 Summer Olympics

References 

Portugal at the Paralympics
1984 in Portuguese sport
Nations at the 1984 Summer Paralympics